Empire Club is a Barbadian association football club based in Bank Hall that competes in the Barbados Premier League.

History
Empire Club was founded on 24 May 1914. The club has won the league championship once, in 1952.

References

External links
Barbados FA profile
Global Sports Archive profile

Football clubs in Barbados